Joseph is an American folk band from Portland, Oregon made up of three sisters: Natalie Closner Schepman, and twins Allison Closner and Meegan Closner. Their first album, Native Dreamer Kin, was self-released in early 2014. Their second album I'm Alone, No You're Not was produced by Mike Mogis and was released on August 26, 2016 by ATO Records. Their third album Stay Awake was released on September 15, 2017 by ATO Records.

History

Founding and Native Dreamer Kin
Joseph was formed when Natalie Closner Schepman, who had been pursuing a solo singer-songwriter career, recruited her younger twin sisters Meegan and Allison to join her on vocals for a new project. They chose their name as a tribute to the town of Joseph, Oregon and their grandfather Jo. Originally performing under a different name, a label representative said the name did not match the gravitas of their songwriting; they had just been camping in Joseph, a regular activity for them, and decided on the name. They self-released their debut album Native Dreamer Kin in 2014, and built a following playing intimate house shows as a trio accompanied by acoustic guitar and foot drum.

I'm Alone, No You're Not
Joseph were signed to ATO Records in 2015, releasing an acoustic two-song digital ATO Sessions EP and accompanying video series. In 2015, they recorded I'm Alone, No You're Not with producer Mike Mogis. The album was released on August 26, 2016. It debuted at #1 on Billboard's Heatseekers chart and remained at the top of the chart for two weeks. They released their first single, "White Flag", on May 24, 2016 with a premiere on NPR's Songs We Love. "White Flag" reached No. 1 on the Adult Alternative Songs chart in October 2016, and charted on Spotify's US Viral Top Ten days after its release. In Fall 2016, Joseph launched an a cappella covers contest, which included submissions from fans, amateur musicians, and college a cappella groups.

The band made their television debut performing "White Flag" on The Tonight Show Starring Jimmy Fallon, followed by appearances on Later... with Jools Holland, Ellen, CONAN, CBS This Morning, and NBC's TODAY. Prior to the album's release, the band was named a Spotify Spotlight Artist and toured with James Bay. The band re-joined Bay as support on a sold-out arena tour in Fall 2016. Joseph has performed both as an acoustic trio and a full band at music festivals across the globe including Coachella, Lollapalooza, Bonnaroo, Newport Folk Festival, Sasquatch Festival, Glastonbury, Outside Lands Music and Arts Festival, Pilgrimage Music Festival and more.

Good Luck, Kid 
On July 9, 2019 the band announced on social media and their website their new album Good Luck, Kid would be released September 13, 2019. The first single, Fighter, was described on Twitter by Meegan  as "a song looking you in the eye and asking you to come alive and fight. It’s asking you to wake up and make a choice to have presence for what and who is in front of you." The title track, “Good Luck Kid,” was released as a single on August 13, 2019.

Discography

Studio albums

EPs

Singles

As lead artist

As featured artist

Notes

References

External links
 Official website

ATO Records artists
Sibling musical trios
Musical groups from Portland, Oregon
American folk musical groups
American pop music groups
All-female bands
PIAS Recordings artists